John Lawrence "Laurie" Hickson (18 July 1862 – 4 August 1920) was an English rugby union footballer who played in the 1880s and 1890s. He played at representative level for England (captain), and Yorkshire, and at club level for Bradford FC, a forward, e.g. front row, lock, or back row. Prior to Tuesday 27 August 1895, Bradford FC was a rugby union club, it then became a rugby league club, and since 1907 it has been the association football (soccer) club Bradford Park Avenue.

Background
John Hickson was born in Clapham Common, his birth was registered in Wandsworth, he died aged 58 in Bradford, West Riding of Yorkshire.

Playing career

Rugby union career
Hickson made his international début while at Bradford FC on Saturday 8 January 1887 at Stradey Park, Llanelli in the Wales versus England match. Subsequent caps were awarded in 1887 against Ireland, and Scotland. England did not play international rugby for two years and then in 1890 he was again selected to play against Wales, Scotland, and he played his last match for England on Saturday 15 March 1890 at Rectory Field, Blackheath in the England versus Ireland match. Of the 6 matches he played for his national side he was on the winning side on 2 occasions.

Change of Code
When Bradford FC converted from the rugby union code to the rugby league code on Tuesday 27 August 1895, Laurie Hickson would have been approximately 33. Consequently, he could have been both a rugby union and rugby league footballer for Bradford FC.

References

External links
Search for "Hickson" at rugbyleagueproject.org
Biography of Richard Thomas Dutton Budworth with an England team photograph including John Laurence Hickson
Photograph "Bradford's Yorkshire Rugby Union Cup winning side - Bradford's only Yorkshire Cup winning side of the Rugby Union era. - 01/01/1884" at rlhp.co.uk
Photograph "Laurie Hickson - Captained Yorkshire and also played for England. He was also president of the Yorkshire RFU. - 01/01/1889" at rlhp.co.uk
Photograph "Bradford (F.C.) c.1888 - This team contained six England internationals. - 01/01/1888" at rlhp.co.uk

1862 births
1920 deaths
Bradford F.C. players
England international rugby union players
English rugby union players
People from Wandsworth
Rugby union forwards
Rugby union players from Clapham Common
Yorkshire County RFU players